Mickey Beyer-Clausen (April 3, 1975 in Copenhagen) is a Danish-born, entrepreneur and philanthropist, living in Southampton New York.

Personal life
Mickey Beyer-Clausen was born in Copenhagen, Denmark in 1975. When Beyer-Clausen's father, Architect Benny Kjær Sørensen past away in 1978, his mother, Purser at Scandinavian Airlines Jette Beyer-Clausen, became a single mother and raised him. In 2006, Beyer-Clausen married Allison Belmore (now Beyer-Clausen) and moved to New York City. In 2008, Mickey and Allison Beyer-Clausen moved to Southampton, New York, where they currently live with their two children, Anna (2009) and Oliver (2011).

Business activities 
Mickey Beyer-Clausen is the co-founder of several technology businesses. In the ’90s, Beyer-Clausen was one of the first to launch internet businesses, and since 2008, Beyer-Clausen has pioneered the use of technology to improve people's lives.

In 1999, Beyer-Clausen co-founded Speednames, and in 2001 Ascio Technologies. Speednames and Ascio Technologies were both acquired by London AIM-listed Group NBT in January 2007 for $36 million.

In 2004, Beyer-Clausen co-founded Trunk Archive, which was acquired by Waddell & Reed and Ivy Asset Strategy Funds in 2013. In 2009, he co-founded Mental Workout.

Beyer-Clausen latest venture, Timeshifter was founded in 2017, and Beyer-Clausen is a co-founder and the CEO of this company.

Philanthropic endeavors
In 2002, Beyer-Clausen formed a foundation called the Happiness Foundation, which supports charitable organizations worldwide with strategic pro bono consultancy rather than money. Today, Beyer-Clausen is the chairman of Happiness Foundation.

References

External links
Mickey Beyer-Clausen's official website
Mickey Beyer-Clausen's official biography in Kraks Blå Bog

1975 births
Living people
Danish philanthropists
Businesspeople from Copenhagen